The Truman Parkway is a historic parkway in Milton and southern Boston, Massachusetts. It runs along the southern boundary of a portion of the Neponset River Reservation and serves as a connection between the Neponset Valley Parkway and the Blue Hills Parkway.  The parkway was built in 1931 and added to the National Register of Historic Places in 2005.

Description
The parkway, a four-lane road, with two lanes in each direction, with a grassy center median strip, then winds southward, roughly following the contours of the Neponset River on the southern edge of the Neponset River Reservation. It has a major junction with Beacon Street and Fairmount Avenue, the latter of which crosses the river into Boston. There is a small local commercial area at this intersection. It then passes through a section with houses lining both sides, until Dana Avenue, at which point a railroad right-of-way to its north separates it from the river. The railroad soon crosses the river, which turns south, and the parkway passes between a section of the Neponset River Reservation and a municipal playground before itself crossing the river into Boston and reaching its southern terminus at the Neponset Valley Parkway.

History
Unlike other Boston-area parkways, the Truman Parkway was constructed by the Massachusetts Department of Public Works, and not the Metropolitan District Commission (MDC) or its predecessors.  It was built in 1931, to standards similar to those used by the MDC for its parkways, and acquired by the MDC in 1956.

See also
National Register of Historic Places listings in Milton, Massachusetts
National Register of Historic Places listings in southern Boston, Massachusetts

References

Roads on the National Register of Historic Places in Massachusetts
Parkways in Massachusetts
Transportation in Norfolk County, Massachusetts
Streets in Boston
Milton, Massachusetts
National Register of Historic Places in Milton, Massachusetts
National Register of Historic Places in Boston
Historic districts on the National Register of Historic Places in Massachusetts
Parks on the National Register of Historic Places in Massachusetts